Richard Dunn Hunter (16 March 1865 – 10 September 1910) was a Scottish footballer who played as a right back.

Career
Hunter played club football for Yoker, St Mirren and Burnley, and made one appearance for Scotland in 1890, in addition to respresenting Renfrewshire on several occasions.

References

1865 births
1910 deaths
Scottish footballers
Scotland international footballers
St Mirren F.C. players
Scottish Football League players
Burnley F.C. players
Association football fullbacks
Sportspeople from Argyll and Bute